Saskia Mulder (born 18 May 1973 in the Hague) is a Dutch film and television actress. She is the younger sister of model Karen Mulder.

Career
Mulder appeared in The Beach and the British horror movie The Descent. She also starred as Fist in the Channel 4 series, The Book Group. She made an appearance as "Francesca" in series 1, episode 1 of Jonathan Creek.

References

External links

1973 births
Dutch film actresses
Dutch television actresses
Living people
Actresses from The Hague
20th-century Dutch actresses
21st-century Dutch actresses